Ariana Di Lorenzo, known professionally as Ariana and the Rose is an American singer and songwriter from New York, New York.

History
Ariana and the Rose released her first EP Head vs Heart in February 2014, after releasing the single HeartBeat in November 2013.  In 2015, Ariana and the Rose released a song titled "Give Up The Ghost". Ariana and the Rose released numerous singles in 2016. In March 2017, Ariana and the Rose performed at the South by Southwest music festival and released her second EP titled Retrograde. Prior to the release, Ariana and the Rose released a song from the EP with the duo RKCB.

In addition to her live performances, Ariana and the Rose is known for her immersive experience "Light + Space". Partnering with venues like House of Yes, Public Hotels, and 3 Dollar Bill, Ariana has brought Light + Space all over the world.

In 2019, Ariana and the Rose released her 3rd EP, Constellations Phase 1. The EP gained critical acclaim from Billboard, NYLON, and The Huffington Post. In the summer of 2019, Ariana and the Rose toured parts of the US and played at Sacramento Pride, Milwaukee Summer Fest and Vans Warped Tour. Ariana and the Rose has toured extensively and shared the stage with artists like Lizzo, Allie X, Weathers, Foxes, Jack Garratt, Torres, and Cyndi Lauper. Other notable performances include sets at Bushwig Festival, Brighton Pride, Lovebox Festival, Latitude Festival, The Great Escape Festival, and SXSW.

The dance single "Every Body" was released in the summer of 2021. To accompany the release of the single, Ariana and the Rose filmed a music video that featured talent like Amanda Lepore, Kandy Muse, Cakes da Killa, CT Hedden, Ryan Burke, Merlot, Rify Royalty, Rhea Litre, Spencer Ludwig and more. The video was filmed at the House of Yes nightclub in New York City. Ariana performed her national US TV debut of "Every Body” on Full Frontal with Samantha Bee on February 3, 2022.

In 2021, Ariana and the Rose went viral on TikTok after posting her "piano chats", videos of herself giving positive affirmations while playing the piano.

Ariana’s latest single 'Setting Me Free’ released March 9, 2022, is the first taste of her forthcoming debut album ‘Lonely Hearts Club’, out Summer 2022.

Discography

Extended plays

Singles

As lead artist

As featured artist

References

Musical groups from New York City
American synth-pop groups